Karpaga is an actress who made her debut in a Tamil movie called Paal. She is the first trans person ever in India to perform a leading role in a mainstream movie.

Personal life
Karpaga was born in a middle-class family of Erode in western Tamil Nadu, an only child, and left home at 17 for Mumbai. Karpaga worked at a beauty parlour as a beautician after finishing schooling. After returning to her family, five years later, her family was shattered but eventually accepted her.

Paal
Historically, transsexuals have been shown in a poor light in Indian movies. Karpaga acts as an intellectual woman who has difficulty in revealing her identity to her lover. The film stresses the need for families to accept transsexuals.

References

External links
timesofinda.indiatimes.com, 8 July 2008, "Transgender to play lead in Tamil film"
bharatstudent.com, "Transgender becomes a hero!!!"

Year of birth missing (living people)
Living people
LGBT Hindus
Indian LGBT actors
Indian LGBT rights activists
Indian film actresses
Tamil actresses
Transgender actresses
People from Erode district
Actresses from Tamil Nadu